Air Time ‘57 (or simply Air Time) is a live musical variety series that aired briefly on ABC.  It was hosted by singer and radio star Vaughn Monroe.  Scheduled opposite shows that were more solidly established, the program lasted little more than three months.

Background
Monroe had previously hosted two other network television shows:  the one-season The Vaughn Monroe Show in 1950 (also known as Camel Caravan and based on the radio show of the same name) and The Vaughn Monroe Show in 1954 and 1955 (a 15-minute summer replacement series for The Dinah Shore Show).  Air Time was an attempt to continue to capitalize on Monroe’s successful singing career.

The show was presented by the U.S. Air Force Reserve (now the Air Force Reserve Command).

Cast
Jazz trumpeter Bobby Hackett and the Elliot Lawrence Orchestra were regulars on the show.  One or more guest stars also appeared each week.

Dorothy Collins guested on the first show.

Broadcast history
Air Time was broadcast at 10:00 pm on Thursdays opposite Playhouse 90 on CBS and Lux Video Theatre on NBC.

References

American Broadcasting Company original programming
1956 American television series debuts
1957 American television series endings
1950s American music television series